Edward Berkeley Portman, 1st Viscount Portman (9 July 1799 – 19 November 1888) was a British Whig politician.

He was an active supporter of the Royal Agricultural Society of England from its commencement in 1838, and served as president in 1846, 1856, and 1862. He was a considerable breeder of Devon cattle and of improved Alderney cows.

Background and education
Portman was born on 9 July 1799 to Edward Portman, of Bryanston and Orchard Portman in Dorset , and his first wife Lucy, elder daughter of Reverend Thomas Whitby of Cresswell Hall, Staffordshire. Portman was educated at Eton and Christ Church, Oxford. At Christ Church, he graduated with first-class honours, B.A. 1821, M.A. 1826.

Political career
In 1823 Portman was elected to Parliament as a Whig for Dorsetshire, a seat he held until 1832, and then represented the newly created constituency of Marylebone from 12 December 1832 to March 1833. On 27 January 1837 Portman was raised to the peerage as Baron Portman of Orchard Portman, and became an active member of the House of Lords. Lord Portman served as Lord Lieutenant of Somerset from 22 May 1839 to June 1864. He was also a councillor and commissioner of the Duchy of Cornwall (starting 19 August 1840), a councillor of Duchy of Lancaster (on 13 February 1847) and as Lord Warden of the Stannaries from 20 January 1865 till his death. On 28 March 1873 he was further honoured when he was created Viscount Portman of Bryanston.  Lord Portman died on 19 November 1888, aged 89, in Bryanston and was succeeded in the barony and viscountcy by his eldest son Henry Berkeley Portman. Another son, Edwin Berkeley Portman, became Member of Parliament for North Devon.

Family
His father (Edward Portman 31 January 1771 - 19 January 1823)
died in 1823. He was a descendant of Sir William Portman, Lord Chief Justice of England between 1555 and 1557. Lord Portman married Lady Emma Lascelles, third daughter of Henry Lascelles, 2nd Earl of Harewood, on 16 June 1827. They had six children, four sons and two daughters, William Henry Berkeley, Edwin Berkeley; Maurice Berkeley, a member of the Canadian parliament; Walter Berkeley, rector of Corton-Denham, Somerset. Emma died on 8 February 1865.

Grandparent Henry Portman

father Edward Portman (31 January 1771 – 19 January 1823)

Mother Lucy Whitby (10 March 1778 – 25 March 1812)

Issue Lady Emma Lascelles (16 March 1809 – 8 February 1865) married on 16 June 1827

References 

Kidd, Charles, Williamson, David (editors). Debrett's Peerage and Baronetage (1990 edition). New York: St Martin's Press, 1990,

Notes

External links 
 

|-

1799 births
1888 deaths
Alumni of Christ Church, Oxford
Whig (British political party) MPs for English constituencies
Lord-Lieutenants of Somerset
People educated at Eton College
UK MPs 1820–1826
UK MPs 1826–1830
UK MPs 1830–1831
UK MPs 1831–1832
UK MPs 1832–1835
UK MPs who were granted peerages
Viscounts in the Peerage of the United Kingdom
Edward
British landowners
Peers of the United Kingdom created by Queen Victoria
Peers of the United Kingdom created by William IV
19th-century British businesspeople